Kwiatkowice  is a village in the administrative district of Gmina Prochowice, within Legnica County, Lower Silesian Voivodeship, in south-western Poland. 

References

Kwiatkowice